The 2003–04 season of the Belgian First Division was held between 8 August 2003 and 15 May 2004.  Sporting Anderlecht became champions on 24 April 2004.

Promoted teams

These teams were promoted from the second division at the start of the season:
Cercle Brugge K.S.V. (second division champions)
K. Heusden-Zolder (playoff winner)

Relegated teams
These teams were relegated to the second division at the end of the season:
K. Heusden-Zolder
R. Antwerp F.C.

Anderlecht's title success
The battle for the title was not great as Anderlecht had a big lead over their opponents (mainly Club Brugge).  However, a bad finish from Anderlecht kept the suspense until the 31st matchday when Club Brugge drew with Mouscron while the team from Brussels also drew (1-1) at Herman Vanderpoortenstadion, the homeground of Lierse.

Battle for Europe
The next week, Club Brugge was sure to enter the UEFA Champions League Preliminary Round with a 1-0 win against Standard Liège, then lying third.  In spite of this defeat, Standard managed to qualify for the UEFA Cup as they were 6 points ahead of Mouscron after the 32nd matchday.  The suspense was killed after a 1-1 draw against Charleroi the next Saturday.

The relegation dog fight
The end of the league was thus centered on the battle against relegation.  Four teams were concerned : R.A.E.C. Mons and Charleroi, which finally saved themselves, R. Antwerp F.C. and K. Beringen-Heusden-Zolder finishing respectively 6 and 5 points adrift.

Final league table

Results

Top goal scorers

See also
2003–04 in Belgian football

References
 Sport.be website - Archive

Belgian Pro League seasons
Belgian
1